Life release is a traditional Buddhist practise of saving the lives of beings that were destined for slaughter. This practise is performed by all schools of Buddhism: Theravada, Mahayana and Vajrayana. It is known as "Tsethar" in Tibetan Buddhism.

History 
Life release has been practised since the 3rd century. It has been performed in Japan since 676, where it is called .

While this practise of life release may naturally need to be spontaneous to successfully save an endangered life, life release can also be planned. Planning often involves purchasing an animal directly from a slaughterhouse or a fishermen; this can often take place on auspicious days in the Buddhist calendar in order for the merit of the act to be multiplied thousands of times. Animals are blessed before being safely returned to their natural environment as prayers are made and often dedicated to someone who is ill or has died, with the belief that person will benefit too from this dedication.

In Tibet an animal is often marked by a ribbon to indicate that the life of the animal has been liberated, with the general understanding that it will be allowed to die of natural causes. The practise in Tibetan Buddhism has been championed in recent times by Chatral Rinpoche, Dilgo Khyentse Yangsi Rinpoche and Ogyen Trinley Dorje. Although this is seen to be the traditional way of carrying out this practise, Ogyen Trinley Dorje has commented that the meaning is broad and that people can use their intelligence to expand the practise in other ways; indicating that planting one tree may be more beneficial that carrying out Tsethar for many beings.

Today, life release involves many types of animal, including birds, reptiles, fish, and mammals, and involves hundreds of millions of individual animals each year.

Criticism 
It is increasingly recognized that animal release has the potential for negative environmental impacts, including as a pathway for the introduction of invasive species into non-native environments. This may lead to biodiversity loss over time. For example, competition from American red-eared slider turtles released in China's lakes has been reported to cause death of native turtles.

Further, some animals are captured for the explicit purpose of being released, or are released into environments where they are unable to survive.

Two Buddhists that released hundreds of non-native crustaceans off the English coast in 2015 were fined more than £28,000 for violating the Wildlife and Countryside Act 1981, with the Marine Management Organisation placing bounties on the crustaceans released.

See also 
 Dhammika Sutta
 Dīghajāṇu Sutta
 Five precepts
 Merit release
 Sigālovāda Sutta
 Transfer of merit
 Vessantara Jātaka

References

External links
 Releasing birds. Merit or sin? (Video)

Buddhist practices
Shinto festivals
Animal welfare
Animal festival or ritual
Animals in Buddhism